Lake Mary is a natural lake in South Dakota, in the United States. 
Lake Mary has the name of the mother of a first settler.

See also
List of lakes in South Dakota

References

Lakes of South Dakota
Lakes of Hamlin County, South Dakota